George Andrew Cables (born November 14, 1944) is an American jazz pianist and composer.

Early life
Cables was born in New York City, United States. He was initially taught piano by his mother. He then studied at the High School of Performing Arts and later at Mannes College (1963–65). He formed the Jazz Samaritans at the age of 18, a band that included Billy Cobham, Steve Grossman, and Clint Houston. Cables' early influences on piano were Thelonious Monk and Herbie Hancock.

Later life and career
Cables has played with Art Blakey, Sonny Rollins, Dexter Gordon, Art Pepper, Joe Henderson, and other well-established jazz musicians.

His own records include the 1980 Cables' Vision with Freddie Hubbard among others. From 1983, Cables worked in the project Bebop & Beyond. He left later in the 1980s, but returned for guest appearances on two early 1990s albums, before rejoining in 1998.

Cables is a charter member of The Cookers band, founded in 2010, which includes leading jazz composers and players like Billy Harper, Eddie Henderson, David Weiss, Donald Harrison, Cecil McBee, Billy Hart and others.

Discography

As leader/co-leader

As sideman
With Laurie Antonioli
 Soul Eyes (Catero, 1984)
With Gary Bartz
Love Song (Vee-Jay International, 1977)
With Art Blakey
 Child's Dance (Prestige, 1972)
With Joe Chambers
 The Almoravid (Muse, 1974)

With The Cookers
 Warriors (Jazz Legacy Productions, 2010)
 Cast The First Stone (Plus Loin Music/Harmonia Mundi, 2011)
 Believe (Motéma Music, 2012)
 Time And Time Again (Motéma Music, 2014)
 The Call Of The Wild And Peaceful Heart (Smoke Sessions Records, 2016)
 Look Out! (Gearbox Records, 2021)

With Joe Farrell
 Sonic Text (Contemporary, 1979)
With Chico Freeman
 Focus (Contemporary, 1995)

With Curtis Fuller
 Crankin' (Mainstream, 1971)

With Dexter Gordon
Sophisticated Giant (Columbia, 1977)

With Billy Harper
 Capra Black (Strata-East, 1973)
With Roy Haynes
Thank You Thank You (Galaxy, 1977)
Vistalite (Galaxy, 1977 [1979])
With Eddie Henderson
 Comin' Through (Capitol, 1977)

With Joe Henderson
 If You're Not Part of the Solution, You're Part of the Problem (Milestone, 1970)
 In Pursuit of Blackness (Milestone, 1971)

With Freddie Hubbard
 Keep Your Soul Together (CTI, 1974)
 High Energy (Columbia, 1974)
 Gleam (Columbia, 1975)
 Liquid Love (Columbia, 1975)
 Windjammer (Columbia, 1976)

With Bobby Hutcherson
 Waiting (Blue Note, 1975)
 Knucklebean (Blue Note, 1977)
 Highway One (Columbia, 1978)
 Conception: The Gift of Love (Columbia, 1979)
 Un Poco Loco (Columbia, 1979)
 Four Seasons (Timeless, 1983 [1985])
 Good Bait (Landmark, 1985)
With Philly Joe Jones
Philly Mignon (Galaxy, 1977)
With Eddie Marshall
 Dance of the Sun (Muse, 1977)
With Greg Marvin
 Taking Off! (Planet X, 1991)
 Special Edition (Planet X, 2001)

With Frank Morgan
Quiet Fire (Contemporary, 1987 [1991] with Bud Shank
Mood Indigo (Antilles, 1989)
A Lovesome Thing (Antilles, 1991)
City Nights: Live at the Jazz Standard (HighNote, 2003 [2004])
Raising the Standard (HighNote, 2002 [2005])
A Night in the Life (HighNote, 2003 [2007])
Montreal Memories (Live Duo Performance) (HighNote, 1989 [2018])

With David "Fathead" Newman
Keep the Dream Alive (Prestige, 1978)

With Art Pepper
 The Trip (Contemporary, 1976)
 No Limit (Contemporary, 1977)
 Thursday Night at the Village Vanguard (Contemporary, 1977 [1979])
 Friday Night at the Village Vanguard (Contemporary, 1977 [1979])
 Saturday Night at the Village Vanguard (Contemporary, 1977 [1979])
 More for Les at the Village Vanguard (Contemporary, 1977 [1985])
 San Francisco Samba (Contemporary, 1977 [1997])
So in Love (Artists House, 1979)
Artworks (Galaxy, 1979 [1984])
 Landscape (Galaxy, 1979)
Besame Mucho (JVC, 1979 [1981])
Roadgame (Galaxy, 1981 [1982])
Art Lives (Galaxy 1981 [1983])
APQ (Galaxy, 1981 [1984])
Arthur's Blues (Galaxy, 1981 [1991])
 Art Pepper: Unreleased Art, Vol. 1 (APM 2006)

With Max Roach
 Lift Every Voice and Sing (Atlantic, 1971)
 To the Max! (Enja, 1990–91)

With Sonny Rollins
 Next Album (Milestone 1972)

With Charlie Rouse
Epistrophy (Landmark, 1989)

With Bud Shank
 Yesterday, Today and Forever (Concord Jazz, 1983) with Shorty Rogers
 California Concert (Contemporary, 1985) with Shorty Rogers
 That Old Feeling (Contemporary, 1986)
Quiet Fire (Contemporary, 1987 [1991] with Frank Morgan

With Woody Shaw
 Blackstone Legacy (Contemporary, 1970)
 Song of Songs (Contemporary, 1972)
 Woody III (Columbia, 1979)

With Archie Shepp 
 Archie Shepp
 California Meeting: Live on Broadway (Soul Note, 1985)

With Bennie Wallace 
 Bennie Wallace in Berlin (Enja Records, 2002)

With Kazumi Watanabe 
 Lonesome Cat (Denon, 1978)

References

External links 
Cables' Official Site
DTM interview
George Cables Interview NAMM Oral History Library (2020)
 An Interview with George Cables by Bob Rosenbaum, February 1983

1944 births
Living people
American jazz pianists
American male pianists
Musicians from New York City
SteepleChase Records artists
DIW Records artists
Black Saint/Soul Note artists
Contemporary Records artists
Concord Records artists
American session musicians
20th-century American pianists
Jazz musicians from New York (state)
21st-century American pianists
20th-century American male musicians
21st-century American male musicians
American male jazz musicians
Bebop & Beyond members
HighNote Records artists